The Massachusetts Office of Technical Assistance (OTA) is a state agency that provides support and guidance to businesses dealing with potentially toxic materials. Established in 1989 following the Toxics Use Reduction Act was passed by the Massachusetts legislature. the OTA is located at the Executive Office of Energy and Environmental Affairs in Boston. Its aim is to promote safe handling and reduction of hazardous materials within Massachusetts businesses.

Mission 
The Massachusetts Office of Technical Assistance (OTA) provides free and confidential technical assistance to manufacturing facilities, companies, and large and small businesses that use, store, and manufacture toxic or hazardous substances and chemicals. The OTA also provides assistance where hazardous by-products are generated or where there are opportunities for energy efficiency, on-site renewable energy, materials conservation and reuse, and water conservation. Technical assistance provided by the OTA is characterized by phone and email assistance as well as on-site visits. The OTA tackles issues relating to pollution prevention, air emissions compliance, chemicals usage, hazardous waste management, energy efficiency, water conservation, wastewater management, plant operations and maintenance, and record keeping. All services are offered on a confidential, non-regulatory basis and provided at no charge to the facility.

See also 

 Massachusetts Toxics Use Reduction Institute

References 



Government of Massachusetts
Government agencies established in 1989
Organizations based in Boston